Anna Paijinda (born ) is a retired Thai volleyball player. She was part of the Thailand women's national volleyball team.

She participated at the 1998 FIVB Volleyball Women's World Championship in Japan, and also at the 2002 FIVB Volleyball Women's World Championship.

References

1974 births
Living people
Anna Paijinda
Place of birth missing (living people)
Volleyball players at the 2002 Asian Games
Southeast Asian Games medalists in volleyball
Anna Paijinda
Competitors at the 1993 Southeast Asian Games
Anna Paijinda
Anna Paijinda
Anna Paijinda